Khorramdasht District is a district (bakhsh) in Takestan County, Qazvin Province, Iran. At the 2006 census, its population was 21,685, in 5,601 families.  The District has one city: Khorramdasht. The District has two rural districts (dehestan): Afshariyeh Rural District and Ramand-e Shomali Rural District.

References 

Districts of Qazvin Province
Takestan County